Richard Humphrey Juckes (21 January 1902 – 21 January 1981) was an English cricketer.  Juckes was a right-handed batsman.  He was born in Horsham, Sussex, and educated at The King's School, Canterbury.

Juckes made a single first-class appearance for Sussex against Cambridge University at the Fenner's, Cambridge in 1924. In Sussex's first-innings, he was dismissed for a single run by Philip Wright, while in their second-innings he was not required to bat. Sussex won the match by 7 wickets.  This was his only major appearance for Sussex.

He died in Tredington, Gloucestershire, on 21 January 1981, his 79th birthday. His brother-in-law, James Douglas, also played first-class cricket.

References

External links
Richard Juckes at ESPNcricinfo
Richard Juckes at CricketArchive

1902 births
1981 deaths
People from Horsham
People educated at The King's School, Canterbury
English cricketers
Sussex cricketers